Alice Mangione (born 19 January 1997) is an Italian sprinter, specialising in the 400 metres. She competed at the 2020 Summer Olympics, in 4 × 400 m relay and 4 × 400 m mixed relay.

Career

Mangione competed with the senior Italy national athletics team in the women's 400 metres and 4 × 400 metres relay events  at the 2021 European Athletics Indoor Championships. In May 2021 she competed with at the 2021 World Athletics Relays obtaining the qualification with the national team of mixed 4x400m relay in Tokyo 2021.

National records
 4x400 metres relay indoor: 3:30.32 (Toruń, Poland, 7 March 2021 with Rebecca Borga, Eloisa Coiro, Eleonora Marchiando) Current holder
 Mixed 4x400 metres relay: 3:16.51 (Tokyo, Japan 30 July 2021 with Edoardo Scotti, Rebecca Borga, Vladimir Aceti) Current holder

Personal best
400 m: 51.47 (Geneva, Switzerland, 11 June 2022)

Achievements

National titles
Mangione won three national championships at individual senior level.

Italian Athletics Championships
400 m: 2020, 2021, 2022

See also
List of Italian records in athletics
Italian all-time top lists - 400 metres

Notes

References

External links

1997 births
Living people
Italian female sprinters
Sportspeople from the Province of Caltanissetta
Athletics competitors of Gruppo Sportivo Esercito
Italian Athletics Championships winners
Athletes (track and field) at the 2020 Summer Olympics
Olympic athletes of Italy
People from Niscemi
21st-century Italian women